The Ministry of Water Supply is a cabinet ministry of the Government of Sri Lanka responsible for the supply of water and maintenance of water and sanitation infrastructure.

List of ministers

Parties

See also
 List of ministries of Sri Lanka

References

External links
 Government of Sri Lanka

Water Supply and Drainage
Water Supply and Drainage
Sri Lanka
2007 establishments in Sri Lanka
Ministries established in 2007